John Chandless (21 August 1884 - 1 June 1968) was a Welsh cricketer.  Chandless was a right-handed batsman who bowled right-arm medium pace.  He was born at Cardiff, Glamorgan.

Chandless made his debut for Glamorgan in the 1911 Minor Counties Championship against Wiltshire.  Chandless played a further 6 Minor Counties Championship matches in 1911, the last of which came against Monmouthshire.  Following the First World War he played 3 further Minor Counties matches for the county, the last of which came against the Surrey Second XI, a year before Glamorgan was granted first-class status.

Chandless made his first-class status debut for the Wales national cricket team in 1926 against Ireland.  Chandless second and final first-class match came in his only first-class appearance for Glamorgan which came against Somerset in 1927 at Cardiff Arms Park.  In his brief first-class career, he took 6 wickets at a bowling average of 15.83, with best figures of 3/13.

Chandless died at Whitchurch, Glamorgan on 1 June 1968.

References

External links
John Chandless at Cricinfo
John Chandless at CricketArchive

1884 births
1968 deaths
Cricketers from Cardiff
Welsh cricketers
Glamorgan cricketers
Wales cricketers